{{Infobox surname
|name = Hassan
|image = 
|imagesize = 
|caption = 
|pronunciation =
|meaning = Arabic: "handsome", "good", "manly", "strong", "benefactor"; Irish and Scottish: "descendant of Osain", "descendant of Oisín"; Jewish: used as a spelling variant of Hazzan "cantor"|region = Arabic, Irish, Scottish, Jewish
|origin = Arabic, Irish, Scottish, Jewish
|variant = 
|footnotes =
}}

Hassan or Hasan is an Arabic, Irish, Scottish, or Jewish (Sephardic and Mizrahic) surname.

Etymology and spelling
There are several unrelated origins for this surname:
 In Ireland/Scotland, the surname Hassan is one of the anglicized forms of the Gaelic (Irish/Scottish) form of Ó hOsáin.  It is to be distinguished from Ó hOisín and Ó hOiseáin (Hession and Hishon). In County Londonderry, where it is numerous, it is spelt Hassan, Hassen, Hasson, Hassin and Hessin.  In the Monaghan Hearth Money Rolls of 1663, it appears as O'Hassan. There was a Hasson of Wexford among the "principal gentlemen" of that county in 1598, but that family was no doubt of non-Gaelic stock, and a John Hassan was an influential merchant in Wexford fifty years earlier.hoganstand.com: Irish Identity Surnames In Irish surnamedb.com: Surnameirishtimes.com: Irish Ancestors Surname Hassan Another derivation is from "Hal's son".
 In Israel and among Sephardi and Mizrahi Jews, the surname Hassan is derived as a spelling variant of Hazzan ("cantor") and therefore most likely represents an alteration of this term through Judaeo-Spanish or Judeo-Arabic.jpost.com: French Jews reclaim 'Jewish' namessephardicgen.com: Sephardic SurnamesTemple Israel , Tulsa Hassan is normally an Arab first or last name; but, in the Jewish Sephardic – Mizrahi traditions, it is a Jewish surname. The Jewish surname Hassan or Hasson (see also  Hassoun), appear to have most likely originated from Spain, from where the Jewish family has initially settled in Morocco and in Livorno, Italy, following 1492 expulsion of the Jews from Spain, and  afterwards following the 16th century has spread throughout the Ottoman Empire (notably to Thessaloniki, Greece; Istanbul, Turkey; in 1592 in Sidon, Lebanon; Damascus, Syria; Constantine, Algeria and Tunis, Tunisia).

Depending on language and region, spelling variations 
Hassan is a surname of many independent linguistic and regional origins, including Arabic (and through the influence of Arabic, languages spoken by Muslims such as Persian, Kurdish, Urdu, Indonesian, Malaysian, Turkish, Uyghur, Turkmen, Somali, Swahili, Berber, Azerbaijani, Crimean Tatar, Tatar,  Bosnian, Albanian, Bengali, etc.), as well as Irish, Scottish, and Jewish.

Therefore, depending on language and region, spelling variations include Hasan, Hassen, Hasson, Hassin, Hassine, Hacen, Hasen, Hasin, Hassa, Hasa, Cassin, Chasan, Chasson, Chason, Khasshan, Khasan, Casan, Case, Hasso, Hassanein, Hasnen, Hess, Hasani, Alhassan (Alhassani), Al-Hassan (Al-Hassani), Lassana, Alassane, Lacen, Lasanah, Assan, Asan, Asanov/Asanova, Hasanov/Hasanova, Klassen, Khasanova, Hasanoff, Jasanoff, Hasanović, Hasanovic, Asanović, Hasanovich, Hasanovski/Hasanovska, Asanovski/Asanovska, O'Hassan, or Haasan (Haasaan, Hasaan).

 List of variant spellings
 In Hebrew transcription:  ( or )
 In Turkish: Hasan, Asan, Hasanoglu, Asanoglu
 In Bosnian: Hasanović, Asanović, Hasović
 In Albanian: Hasani or Hasan
 In Armenian: Hassanian or Hasanian
 In Azerbaijan: Həsən
 In Kurdish: Hesan
 In Kazakh: Asan or Äsem 
 In Bengali transcription: হাসান (Hāsān)
 In Somali: Xasan
 In West Africa: Lassana, Alassane and Lacen, derived from al-Hassan.
 In Finland: Hasanen for Hassan, derived from the Arabic Hassan and the Finnish suffix for surnames -en.
 In French: Hassan, Hassen, Hasson or Hacen
 In Spanish: Hassan, Hassán, Hacen, Hacén, Jassan, Jassán, Jasan, Jasán, Hasson or Jasanoff
 In Russian transcription: Хасан, Хассан, Хассен, Хэссан, Гасан, Асан, Асанов/Хасанов (masculine), Асанова/Хасанова (feminine)
 In Croatian/Serbian/Montenegrin: Asanović, Hasanović, Hasović
 In China, some Muslims believe that their surname Ha is abbreviated from Arabic Hassan.

Popularity of the surname
The popularity of the name Hassan or its variants Hasson, Hassen, Hassin is not only in the Arab world (including Arab Christians) but also in the Muslim world.
The Irish last name Hassan or its variants Hasson, Hassen, Hassin is frequently found especially in the area of Derry in Northern Ireland and also everywhere where there is a sizable Irish diaspora like in United States, Canada, United Kingdom, Australia and New Zealand.
The frequency of the Jewish last name Hassan – or its variants Hasson, Hassen, Hassin – is mostly among Sephardic and Mizrahi Jews, used as a spelling variant of Hazzan.

People

A
 Abbas Hassan (born 1985), Lebanese-born Swedish footballer
 Abd Al Naser Hasan (born 1990), Syrian footballer
 'Abd al-Razzaq al-Hasani (1903–1997), Iraqi historian and politician
 Abdelhamid Hassan (born 1972), Egyptian footballer
 Abdelilah Mohammed Hassan (1934–2022), Iraqi football coach
 Abdelkarim Hassan (born 1993), Qatari footballer
 Abdi Yusuf Hassan (born 1953), Somali politician
 Abdi Shakur Sheikh Hassan (died 2011), Somali politician
 Abdiqasim Salad Hassan (born 1941), Somali politician – president of Somalia (2001–2004)
 Abdirahman Ali Hassan, Kenyan politician
 Abdirahman Mohamud Haji Hassan, Somali politician
 Abdul Hamid Ali Hassan, Bahraini diplomat
 Abdul Hassan (lawyer) (born 1974), Guyanese-American lawyer
 Abdul Majid Hassan (1380–1408), Sultan of Brunei
 Abdul Naza Alhassan (born 1990), Ghanaian football player
 Abdullahi Mohammad Ahmad Hassan (1928–2022), Sudanese politician
 Abdulmumini M. Hassan, Nigerian politician
 Abdulqadir Hassan (born 1962), Emirati football figure, grandson of Ali
 Abdusalom Khasanov, Tajikistani boxer 
 Abid Hasan (diplomat) (1911–1984), Indian military officer and diplomat
 Abrar Hasan (born 1935), Pakistani lawyer and constitutional expert
 Abu'l-Hasan (artist) (1589 – c. 1630), Indian painter
 Abu Hashim al-Hasan (before 1031–1040), Yemeni imam
 Abul Hasan (cricketer) (born 1992), Bangladeshi cricketer
 Abul Hasan (poet) (1947–1975), Bangladeshi poet and journalist
 Adlan Khasanov (1970–2004), Russian journalist and photographer
 Adnan Abu Hassan (1959–2016), Malaysian composer and musician
 Adnan Badr Hassan, Syrian security officer
 Aftab Hasan, Pakistani educationist and linguist
 Ahmad Ali Hasan (1916–2010), Syrian poet
 Ahmad Y. al-Hassan (1925–2012), historian of Arabic and Islamic science and technology
 Ahmed Hassan (born 1975), Egyptian footballer
 Ahmad Hassan, Syrian politician
 Ahmed Hassanein (1889–1946), Egyptian courtier, diplomat and fencer
 Ahmed Issack Hassan (born 1970), Kenyan lawyer
 Ahmed M. Hassan, Somali politician
 Ahmed Mohamed Hassan (born 1945), Djiboutian politician
 Akram Hasson (born 1959), Druze Israeli politician
 Al-Mansur al-Hasan (1199–1271), Yemeni imam
 Al-Muntakhab al-Hasan (died 936), Yemeni imam
 Alberto Hassan (born c. 1942), Argentinian singer
 Ali Hasan (born 1965), Kuwaiti fencer
 Ali Hasan (student), Bahraini boy arrested for politically protesting at age 11
 Ali Hassan (born 1972), Indian television actor
 Ali Hasanov (born 1976), Azerbaijani artist, musician and filmmaker
 Ali M. Hasanov (born 1960), Azerbaijani professor and politician
 Ali S. Hasanov, Azerbaijani politician
 Ali Said Hassan, Somali filmmaker
 Aliagha Hasanov (1871–1933), Azerbaijani statesman
 Aljoša Asanović (born 1965), Croatian footballer
 Aly Hassan (born 1989), American soccer player
 Amadou Alassane (born 1983), French born Mauritanian football player
 Amir Hasan (14th century), Chupanid prince of the Ilkhanate
 Amir Alexander Hasson, entrepreneur
 Amira Hass (born 1956), Israeli journalist and author
 Amira Hess, Israeli poet and artist
 Ammar Hassan (born 1976), Palestinian singer – placed second in Super Star 2 An-Nasir al-Hasan (1457–1523), Yemeni imam
 Andi Hasa (born 1990), Albanian footballer
 Anjum Hasan, Indian poet and novelist
 Anna Hassan, British educator
 Anne Cassin, Irish journalist and news presenter
 Anthony Lacen (1950–2004), American jazz tubaist and band leader
 Antonio Asanović (1991), Croatian footballer
 Anu Hasan (born 1970), Indian actress and TV anchor in the Tamil language
 Arif Hasan, Pakistani architect, planner, teacher, social researcher and writer
 Arshad Hasan (born 1980), American political organizer
 Asher Hassin (1918–1995), Israeli politician
 Asim Hassan (born 1986), Indian football player
 Asma Gull Hasan, Pakistani-American writer and attorney
 Athancode Asan (Sangam period), Indian poet
 Awang Hassan (1910–1998), Malaysian politician

B
 Barbara Cassin (born 1947), French philologist and philosopher
 Baruch Hassan (born 1959), Israeli footballer and manager
 Basher Hassan (born 1944), Kenyan cricketer
 Basma Hassan (born 1976), Egyptian actress
 Bilal Hassani (born 1999), French singer
 Bob Hasan (1931–2020), Indonesian businessman and politician

C
 Callum Hassan (born 1993), English footballer
 Che Hisamuddin Hassan (born 1972), Malaysian football player
 Chiara Cassin (born 1978), Italian synchronized swimmer
 Christopher Paul Hasson (born 1969), American former Coast Guard officer arrested in February 2019

D
 Daisy Hasan, Indian-English author and teacher
 David Ben Hassin (1727–1792), Moroccan Jewish poet
 David Hassan (born 1972), Northern Irish academic, writer, and current Professor of Sport Policy and Management at the University of Ulster
 Dinara Asanova (1942–1985), a Soviet film director

E
 Edon Hasani (born 1992), Albanian footballer
 Emilio Hassan (born 1977), Mexican soccer player
 Enver Hasani, Kosovar Albanian academic, university rector and judge
 Eric Hass (1905–1980), American politician
 Esther Hasson (1867–1942), American military nurse

F
 Faeq Hassan (1914–1992), Iraqi painter
 Faiq Hasanov (born 1938), Azerbaijani chess arbiter, coach and television presenter
 Fairoz Hasan (born 1988), Singaporean footballer
 Faisal Ali Hassan (born 1981), Emarati footballer
 Faizul Hasan, Bangladeshi politician
 Falah Hassan (born 1951), Iraqi football player
 Farkhonda Hassan (born 1930), Egyptian professor of geology
 Farris Hassan (born 1989), American student journalist who, at age 16, went to Iraq without parental consent
 Fathi Hassan (born 1957), Egyptian-Italian artist
 Fatimah bint al-Hasan (7th century), Islamic historical figure, daughter of Hasan ibn Ali
 Fekri Hassan, geoarchaeologist
 Ferhan Hasani (born 1990), Macedonian footballer
 Fleur Hassan-Nahoum (born September 27, 1973), Israeli politician and policy maker
 Frank T. Hassa (1873 – after 1902), American politician from Wisconsin
 Fred Hassan (born 1946), Pakistani-American business executive
 Frederick Hassan (1859–1940), Egyptian-born English cricketer
 Fuad Hassan (1929–2007), Indonesian politician

G
 Galit Hasan-Rokem (born 1945), Israeli professor of folklore
 Gayratjon Hasanov (born 1983), Uzbek footballer
 Gemma Hasson, Northern Irish folk singer
 Gene Hasson (1915–2003), American baseball player
 Gerry Hassan (born 1964), Scottish writer and academic
 George Alhassan or Jair (born c. 1954), Ghanaian footballer
 George Alhassan (footballer, born 1941) (born 1941), Ghanaian football player
 Ghada Hassine (born 1993), Tunisian weightlifter
 Ghanem Ibrahim al-Hassan (died 2011), Syrian military officer
 Gholamreza Hassani (born 1928), Iranian imam
 Gotfrid Hasanov (1900–1965), Russian composer
 Guillermo Martínez Casañ (born 1955), Spanish politician
 Guy Hasson, Israeli playwright, film maker and science fiction writer

H
 Hajim al-Hassani (born 1954), Iraqi politician
 Hamedah Hasan, American subject of a documentary
 Hameed Hassan (born 1987), Afghan cricketer
 Hamid Hassani (born 1968), Iranian Persian language scholar and researcher
 Hamdi Hassan (1956–2021), Egyptian politician
 Hanan Qassab Hassan (born 1952), Syrian writer and academic
 Hani al-Hassan (1939–2012), Palestinian politician
 Hans Hass (born 1919), Austrian underwater diver
 Harry Hasso (1904–1984), German filmmaker
 Hasan Hasanov (born 1940), Azerbaijani politician and diplomat
 Haseeb-ul-Hasan (1964–1990), Pakistani cricketer and murder victim
 Hashim Khamis Hassan, Iraqi football player
 Hassan Abdallah Hassan, Somali politician
 Hassan Aziz Hassan (1924–2000), Egyptian prince of the Muhammad Ali dynasty
 Hassan Mohamed Hassan (1906–1990), Egyptian artist
 Hassan Hassanein (1916–1957), Egyptian golfer
 Hayder Hassan, UFC Fighter
 Hieronymus Albrecht Hass (1689–1752), German harpsichord and clavichord maker
 Hossam Hassan (born 1966), Egyptian footballer and coach
 Hossam Hassan (footballer, born 1989) (born 1989), Egyptian footballer
 Houssein Omar Hassan (born 1977), Djiboutian athlete
 Hussein Hasan famous Somali poet and warrior 
 Humaira Hasan, Pakistani diplomat
 Hussein Hajj Hassan (born 1960), Lebanese politician

I
 Ibragim Khasanov (1937–2010), Soviet sprint canoer
 Ibrahem Al-Hasan (born 1986), Kuwaiti table tennis player
 Ibrahim Hassan (born 1966), Egyptian footballer
 Ibrahim Hassan (athlete) (born 1971), Ghanaian runner
 Ibrahim Al Hasan, Syrian football player
 Ihab Hassan (born 1925), American literary theorist
 Iliass Bel Hassani (born 1992), Dutch footballer
 Irwin Hasen (born 1918), American cartoonist
 Isaac Cleto Hassan, South Sudanese physician and politician
 Ismaël Alassane (born 1984), Nigerien footballer
 Ismail Ahmed Kadar Hassan (born 1987), Djiboutian-French footballer

J
 JP Hasson (born 1977), American musician, comedian and writer
 Jabrayil Hasanov (born 1990), Azerbaijani freestyle wrestler
 Jack Cassin (1915–1994), Australian Australian rules footballer
 Jacob Hassan (1936–2006), Spanish academic, writer, and university Professor in Universidad Complutense de Madrid of Jewish descent
 Jakob Meyer zum Hasen (1482–1531), bürgermeister of the city of Basel and patron
 Jalal Hassan (born 1991), Iraqi football player
 Jalaluddin Hasan, 25th Nizāri Ismā‘ilī Imām
 Jalaluddin Hassan (born 1954), Malaysian actor and television host
 James Hasson (born 1992), Australian professional rugby league player 
 Jamil Hassan (died 2012), Syrian military officer
 Jan Alam Hassani (born 1956), Afghan volleyball player
 Jared Hassin (born 1989), American football player
 Jasur Hasanov (footballer, born 1983), Uzbek football player
 Jasur Hasanov (footballer, born 1989), Uzbek football player
 Jay Jasanoff (born 1942), American linguist and Indo-Europeans
 Joel Hass, American mathematician and professor
 Johann Adolph Hass (1713–1771), German clavichord and harpsichord maker
 John Cassin (1813–1869), American ornithologist
 John Cassin (footballer) (born 1951), Australian Australian rules footballer
 Joshua Hassan (1915–1997), Gibraltarian politician of Jewish descent – chief minister for 17 years

K
 Kalif Alhassan (born 1990), Ghanaian footballer
 Kamal Haasan (born 1954), Indian actor, screenwriter, producer and director
 Kamarulzaman Hassan (born 1979), Malaysian footballer
 Karam Hasanov (born 1969), Azerbaijani politician
 Karen Hassan (born 1981), Northern Irish actress
 Karim Alhassan (born 1991), Ghanaian footballer
 Karl Hass (1912–2004), German SS officer
 Kazem Hasan (born 1961), Kuwaiti fencer
 Kevin Hasson, American attorney focused on religious liberty issues
 Khaled al-Hassan (1928–1994), Palestinian politician and founder of Fatah
 Khalid Hasan (c. 1935–2009), Pakistani journalist and writer
 Khalid Hasan (cricketer) (born 1937), Pakistani cricketer
 Khalid Hassan (died 2007), Iraqi interpreter and reporter
 Kobi Hassan (born 1978), Israeli football player
 Kumaran Asan (1873–1924), Indian poet in the Malayalam language

L
 Lama Hasan, British journalist
 Leila Hassan (born 1948), British editor and activist
 Lina Hawyani al-Hasan (born 1975), Syrian novelist, journalist and writer
 Lotte Hass (born 1928), Austrian underwater diver
 Ludwik Hass (1918–2008), Polish historian

M
 M. M. Hassan (born 1947), Indian politician
 M. M. S. Abul Hassan, Indian politician
 Maddie Hasson (born 1995), American actress
 Maggie Hassan (born 1958), American politician and Senator from New Hampshire
 Maha Hassan, Syrian-Kurdish journalist and novelist
 Mahmoud Hassan (born 1919), Egyptian Greco-Roman wrestler
 Mahmud al-Hasan (1851–1920), Indian religious scholar
 Mahmudul Hasan (born 1990), Bangladeshi cricketer
 Malik Dohan al-Hassan (1919–2021), Iraqi politician
 Mamoun Hassan, Saudi Arabian-British screenwriter, director, editor, producer and teacher
 Manor Hassan (born 1979), Israeli football player
 Mansour Hassan (born 1937), Egyptian politician
 Margaret Hassan (1945–2004), Irish aid worker murdered in Iraq
 Maria Hassan (born 1952), Swedish politician
 Mariam Hasan (born 1985), Pakistani cricketer
 Mariem Hassan (1958–2015), Sahrawi singer and lyricist
 Mark Chasan, entrepreneur, investment banker, lawyer and digital media pioneer
 Mark Hass (born 1956), American politician
 Marlene Hassan Nahon (born 1976), Gibraltarian historian and journalist
 Masahudu Alhassan (born 1992), Ghanaian footballer
 Masuma Hasan, Pakistani scholar and politician
 Maurice Hasson (born 1934), French-Venezuelan violinist
 Maxine Cassin (1927–2010), American poet, editor and publisher
 Mehdi Lacen (born 1984), Algerian footballer
 Mehdi Hasan, British journalist
 Mehdi Hassan (1927–2012), Pakistani ghazal and playback singer
 Mehr Hassan, Asian-American actress, model and classical dancer
 Mekaal Hasan (born 1972), Pakistani musician and record producer
 Melissa Hasin (born 1954), American cellist
 Mirza Hasanović (born 1990), Bosnian footballer
 Mian Ijaz ul Hassan, Pakistani painter
 Michael Hasani (1913–1975), Israeli politician
 Mike Hass (born 1983), American football player
 Mir Emad Hassani (1554–1615), Persian calligrapher
 Mohamad Hasan (politician) (born 1956), Malaysian politician
 Mohamad Al Hasan (born 1988), Syrian football player
 Mohamed Hassani, Egyptian discus thrower
 Mohamed Alhousseini Alhassan (born 1978), Nigerien swimmer
 Mohamed H.A. Hassan (born 1947), Sudanese scientist
 Mohammad Hasan Rahmani (died 2016), Afghan politician
 Mohammad Al Hajj Hassan (born 1976), Lebanese cleric
 Mohammad Ali Tabatabaei Hassani (born 1945), Iraqi marja' Mohammed Abdullah Hassan (1856–1920), Somali religious and military leader, emir of king Diiriye Guure
 Mohammed Ali al-Hasani (died 2007), Iraqi politician
 Mohammed Alhassan (born 1984), Ghanaian footballer
 Mohammed Hassan (footballer) (1912–1986), Egyptian footballer
 Mohammed Mohammed Hassen, Yemeni Guantanamo detainee
 Mohammed Waheed Hassan (born 1953), Maldivian politician – president of the Maldives
 Mohd Fareed Shah Hassan (born 1979), Malaysian footballer
 Mohd Hasmarul Fadzir Hassan (born 1986), Malaysian footballer
 Mohd Hasmawi Hassan (born 1980), Malaysian footballer
 Mohd Shoaib Hassan (born 1990), Pakistani squash player
 Mohd Sidek Hassan (born 1951), Malaysian politician
 Moinul Hassan, Indian politician
 Mona Hassanein (born 1985), Egyptian fencer
 Monazir Hassan (born 1957), Indian politician
 Moria Casán (born 1946), Argentine actress, television host and producer
 Mosaab Mahmoud Al Hassan (born 1983), Sudanese-Qatari footballer
 Mouez Hassen (born 1995), French-Tunisian footballer
 Moulay Hassan, Crown Prince of Morocco (born 2003), Moroccan heir apparent to the throne
 Moulay Rachid ben al Hassan (born 1970), Moroccan prince and diplomat
 Moustapha Alassane (born 1942), Nigerien filmmaker
 Mubashir Hassan (born 1922), Pakistani civil engineer and science administrator
 Muhammad Abu Khubza al-Hassani (born 1932), Moroccan cleric
 Muhammad Hasan (1902–unknown), Afghan prince
 Muhammad Hassan (reign 1582–1598 or 1601–1610), ninth Sultan of Brunei
 Muhammad Hassan (born 1981), American professional wrestler born Mark Copani
 Muhammad Hassanein, Egyptian government administrator
 Muhammad Sa'id Ali Hasan, person once on the FBI Seeking Information – War on Terrorism list
 Muhammmad Nurridzuan Abu Hassan (born 1992), Malaysian footballer
 Muley Hacén or Abu l-Hasan Ali, Sultan of Granada (before 1464–1485), Iberian Peninsula ruler
 Munawwar Hasan (1964–2008), Indian politician
 Murat Khasanov (born 1970), Russian judoka
 Murtaza Hassan or Mastana (c. 1940/1941–2011), Pakistani comedian
 Musa Hassan (born 1952), Malaysian inspector-general of police
 Musa Bin Jaafar Bin Hassan, Omani diplomat and academic
 Mushirul Hasan (born 1949), Indian historian, author and academic
 Mustafa Hassan (born 1990), Iraqi-Danish footballer
 Muzaffar Hassan (1920–2012), Pakistani naval officer
 Muzzammil Hassan (born 1964), Pakistani-American business executive and convicted murderer

N
 Nabra Hassanen (abt. 2000–2017), American student killed during Ramadan
 Naeem U. Hasan, Pakistani diplomat
 Najmul Hasan (born 1984), Bangladeshi qari (Qur'an reciter)
 Nataša Lačen (born 1971), Slovenian cross country skier
 Nazia Hassan (born 1965), Pakistani pop singer
 Nidal Hasan (born 1970), American mass murderer and terrorist who perpetrated the 2009 Fort Hood shooting
 Nihad Hasanović (born 1974), Bosnian writer and translator
 Norizam Ali Hassan (born 1976), Malaysian footballer
 Norman Hassan (born 1958), English musician of Yemeni and Welsh descent
 Numon Khasanov (born 1971), Uzbekistani football player
 Nurullah Hasan (1867 or 1870–1912), Turkish wrestler

O
 Olivier Cassan (born 1984), French football player
 Omar Hasan (born 1971), Argentine rugby union footballer
 Omar Hassan (skateboarder), American skateboarder
 Omar Said Al-Hassan, chairman of the Gulf Centre for Strategic Studies, London
 Ömer Asan (born 1961), Turkish folklorist, photographer and writer
 Osama Hassan (born 1979), Egyptian footballer

P
 Phil Hassan (born 1974), English rugby league and rugby union footballer

Q
 Qasim ibn Hasan (c. 666–680), Islamic historical figure, son of Hasan ibn Ali
 Qiwam al-Din Muhammad al-Hasani (17th century), Persian physician
 Quamrul Hassan (1921–1988), Bangladeshi artist

R
 Radwan Al-Sheikh Hassan, Syrian football player
 Rahma Hassan (born 1988), Egyptian actress and model
 Rahma bint El Hassan (born 1969), Jordanian princess
 Raja Hasan (born 1979), Indian playback singer
 Ramiz Hasanov (born 1961), Azerbaijani politician
 Rana Naved-ul-Hasan (born 1978), Pakistani cricketer
 Raqibul Hasan (cricketer, born 1953) (born 1953), Bangladeshi cricketer
 Raqibul Hasan (cricketer, born 1987) (born 1987), Bangladeshi cricketer
 Rashid bin El-Hassan (born 1979), Jordanian prince
 Rauf Hassan (born 1945), Kurdish writer
 Ray Hass (born 1977), Australian swimmer
 Raya Haffar Al Hassan (born 1967), Lebanese finance minister
 Raza Hasan (born 1992), Pakistani cricketer
 René Cassin (1887–1976), French jurist, law professor and judge
 Rezal Hassan (born 1974), Singaporean football player
 Riaz Hassan, Australian sociologist and academic
 Ric Hassani, Nigerian singer songwriter
 Riccardo Cassin (1909–2009), Italian mountaineer, inventor and author
 Richard L. Hasen, American professor of Law
 Richard S. Hassan, American Air Force officer of Irish descent 
 Ridzuan Fatah Hasan (born 1981), Singaporean soccer player
 Riffat Hassan (born 1943), Pakistani-American theologian
 Rilwan Olanrewaju Hassan (born 1991), Nigerian football player
 Rizik Zackaria Hassan, South Sudanese politician
 Rizwana Hasan (born 1968), Bangladeshi attorney and environmentalist
 Robert Hass (born 1941), American poet
 Robert Bernard Hass, American poet, literary critic and professor
 Rosa Yaseen Hasan (born 1974), Syrian writer
 Roy Hasson, Australian rugby league footballer
 Rudolph Hass (1892–1952), American developer of the Hass avocado
 Ruqaiya Hasan, Indian professor of linguistics
 Rushan Khasanov (born 1956), Russian football player

S
 S. Azmat Hassan, Pakistani ambassador
 Sahib Abbas Hassan, Iraqi football player
 Said Hasan, Fiji-Indian politician
 Saiyid Nurul Hasan, Indian historian and politician
 Sajid Hasan (born 1958), Pakistani actor
 Sajjadul Hasan (1978–2007), Bangladeshi cricketer
 Salim Al-Hassani, Iraqi-United Kingdom engineer and professor
 Samir Kadhim Hassan (born 1969), Iraqi football player
 Sardar Hasanov (born 1985), Azerbaijani weightlifter
 Sarvath El Hassan (born 1947), Pakistani princess – wife of the Prince of Jordan
 Selim Hassan (1887–1961), Egyptian Egyptologist
 Selma Hassan, Eritrean politician
 Shahzaib Hasan (born 1989), Pakistani cricketer
 Shakib Al Hasan (born 1987), Bangladeshi cricketer
 Shada Hassoun (born 1981), Iraqi–Moroccan singer
 Sharaf ad-Din ibn al-Hasan (13th century), religious leader
 Sheila Jasanoff, American academic in the field of science and technology studies
 Shemsu Hassan (born 1968), Ethiopian racewalker
 Shpëtim Hasani (born 1982), Kosovar footballer
 Shruti Haasan (born 1986), Indian actress
 Sibte Hassan (1916–1986), Pakistani scholar, journalist and activist
 Sifan Hassan (born 1993), Ethiopian-Dutch runner
 Signe Hasso (1915–2002), Swedish-born American actress, writer and composer
 Sinan Hasani (1922–2010), Yugoslavian novelist and statesman – president of Yugoslavia
 Sreten Asanović (1931), Yugoslav and Montenegrin author
 Stan Cassin, Canadian politician from Alberta
 Stephen Cassin (1783–1857), American naval officer, recipient of the Congressional Gold Medal
 Steve Hass (born 1975), American drummer
 Steven Hassan (born 1954), American mental health counselor of Jewish descent
 Suhardi Hassan (born 1982), Malaysian racing cyclist
 Sulayman bin Hassan (16th century), Da'i-ul-Mutlaq of the Sulaymanis
 Sumaya bint El Hassan (born 1971), Jordanian princess
 Susanna Al-Hassan, Ghanaian politician
 Syed Ali Hasan (before 1902–1962), Indian cricketer and police official
 Syed Hamidul Hasan, Indian ayatullah
 Syed Mir Hassan (1844–1929), Indian scholar of the Qur'an, Hadith, Sufism and Arabic
 Syed Munawar Hasan (born 1944), Pakistani politician
 Syed Shamsul Hasan (1885–1981), Pakistani politician
 Syed Wazir Hasan (1874–1947), Indian jurist and politician
 Syed Zafarul Hasan (1885–1949), Pakistani philosopher

T
 TJ Hassan (born 1981), American actor and musician of North African descent.
 Tabriz Hasanov, Azerbaijani footballer
 Taim Hasan (born 1976), Syrian actor
 Taj al-Din al-Hasani (1885–1943), Syrian leader and politician
 Talha ibn Hasan (7th century), imam
 Tamer Hassan (born 1968), British actor of Turkish Cypriot descent
 Tammam Hassan (1918–2011), Egyptian expert in Arabic linguistics
 Tarek Ali Hassan (born 1937), Egyptian professor, physician, composer, musician, painter and philosopher
 Tariq Hassan (born 1983), Emirati footballer
 Tengku Hazman Raja Hassan (born 1977), Malaysian footballer
 Teuku Muhammad Hasan (1906–1997), Indonesian politician – governor of Sumatra
 Thomas Hassan, American educational administrator of Irish descent
 Toni Hassan (born 1972), Australian writer and journalist

U
 Ulubatlı Hasan (1428–1453), Ottoman soldier
 Umar Hassan, Eritrean military officer
 Umar Bin Hassan (born 1948), American poet
 Usama Hasan, British scientist and cleric
 Uzun Hassan (1423–1478), sultan of the Aq Qoyunlu dynasty, or White Sheep Turkmen

V
 Victor Hassan, Israeli football player
 Victor Hassine (1956–2008), American prisoner and author
 Victor Hasson (1957–2005), Burundian entrepreneur
 Victorian of Asan (died c. 560), Spanish saint

W
 Wajid Shamsul Hasan, Pakistani diplomat
 Walid Hassan (c. 1959–2006), Iraqi comedian
 Walter Hass (c. 1911–1987), American football coach and athletic director
 Walter Hassan (1905–1996), British automobile engineer of Irish descent
 Wan Jamak Wan Hassan (born 1957), Malaysian footballer and coach
 Waqar Hasan (1932–2020), Pakistani cricketer
 Wissam al-Hassan (1965–2012), Lebanese military officer

X
 Xhem Hasa (1908–1945), Albanian soldier

Y
 Yaël Hassan (born 1952), French-Israeli author
 Yarin Hassan (born 1994), Israeli footballer
 Yaron Hasson, Israeli guitar player
 Yisrael Hasson (born 1955), Israeli politician
 Yoel Hasson (born 1972), Israeli politician
 Yousif Hassan, Emirati footballer

Z
 Zahid Hasan, Bangladeshi actor
 Zainal Abidin Hassan (born 1963), Malaysian footballer and manager
 Zakir Hasan (born 1972), Bangladeshi cricketer
 Zohaib Hassan (born 1966), Pakistani pop icon
 Zoya Hasan, Indian academic and political scientist
 Zulkifli Hasan (born 1962), Indonesian politician

Fictional characters
Dr. Lily Hassan, character in the British soap opera DoctorsHassani (Sleeper Cell character), character in the American television series Sleeper CellOmar Hassan (24 character), character in the American television series 24''

See also
Hazan (disambiguation)
Hassan (given name)
Hession (surname)
Hassoun
Hasson Heights, Pennsylvania, a census-designated place
Irish name
Osáin
Hass (surname)
Lists of most common surnames

References

Surnames
Arabic-language surnames
Anglicised Irish-language surnames
Gaelic-language surnames
Jewish surnames
Mizrahic surnames
Sephardic surnames
Scottish surnames
Surnames of Arabic origin
Surnames of Irish origin
Surnames of Israeli origin
Surnames of Scottish origin
Surnames of Chadian origin
Surnames of Maldivian origin
Maldivian-language surnames
bg:Хасан
de:Hassan
fr:Hassan
nl:Hassan (achternaam)
ja:ハサン
no:Hassan
ru:Хасан (имя)